Food & Wine is an American monthly magazine published by Dotdash Meredith. It was founded in 1978 by Ariane and Michael Batterberry.  It features recipes, cooking tips, travel information, restaurant reviews, chefs, wine pairings and seasonal/holiday content and has been credited by The New York Times with introducing the dining public to "Perrier, the purple Peruvian potato and Patagonian toothfish".

The premier event for the magazine is the Food & Wine Classic in Aspen, Colorado. The Classic features wine tasting, cooking demonstrations, featured speakers, as well as a cooking competition. Held annually in June, the event is considered the kickoff to the Aspen summer season and celebrates its 38th anniversary in 2022.

The winner of Top Chef, the reality television cooking competition, is featured in a spread in this magazine.

History

Michael and Ariane Batterberry's early writing work on food included the 1973 book On the Town in New York, From 1776 to the Present, a culinary history of New York City that was republished in 1998 by Routledge in celebration of the book's 25th anniversary. The Batterberrys had first met an arts benefit on the roof of Manhattan's St. Regis Hotel and hadn't initially been food writers, with Michael working as a journalist and the couple working together as arts editors at Harper's Bazaar. They first conceived of the idea of writing a book about food all over the world after spending a weekend together with best-selling wine writer Hugh Johnson, who later dropped out of the writing project. The original edition of the book was described by The Washington Post as "the authoritative history of dining in the country's culinary capital". The Batterberry's saw "a big changeover at the moment we founded Food and Wine in the late '70s" from a time when "it was the little wife in the kitchen" to a period in which more men developed an interest in cooking.

With Robert and Lindy Kenyon covering the business side and with funding by Hugh Hefner, the Batterberrys started publishing The International Review of Food and Wine in 1978, which had a prototype issue published in Playboy. Later renamed simply Food & Wine, the magazine's mission was to be a more down-to-earth alternative to Gourmet and its "truffled pomposity", with the goal of appealing to both women and men as readers, and early issues featuring articles by such non-traditional food writers as George Plimpton and Wilfrid Sheed. When it was first published, a senior editor of Gourmet magazine scoffed at the new alternative, saying "We don't look at the others as competition. They look at us, try to copy us and fail miserably". By 1980, when it was sold to American Express, the magazine had circulation of 250,000 per issue, evenly split by gender, and was distributing 900,000 copies a month as of 2009. The magazine's style of simple meals, diet foods and easy-to-follow cooking instructions set a standard that became the model for a generation of cooking shows and publications. The Batterberrys went on to co-found Food Arts magazine, a publication aimed at restaurants and hotels.

Editors-in-Chief

Dana Cowin served as the editor-in-chief of Food & Wine for 21 years. She resigned from the post in late 2015. In February 2016, Nilou Motamed replaced her as editor-in-chief. In June 2017, Hunter Lewis replaced her as editor-in-chief.

Food & Wine Classic
The Food & Wine Classic is an annual event presented by Food & Wine Magazine since 1986.  The Classic takes place in Aspen, Colorado in June of each year.  The event features wine tasting, cooking demonstrations, featured speakers, as well as a cooking competition.

The event celebrated its 30th anniversary in 2012, featuring singers Cee Lo Green, Elvis Costello, athlete Wes Welker, and chef Bobby Flay.

A trip to the event is offered as part of the grand prize for the winner of the reality television series Top Chef.

On June 19, 2011, QVC did broadcast the Food & Wine Classic live.

Food & Wine Best New Chefs
Since 1988, Food & Wine has published an annual list of the ten best new chefs in America. Among the notable chefs recognized by the magazine are: Thomas Keller (1988), Nobu Matsuhisa (1989), Nancy Silverton (1990), Tom Colicchio (1991), Eric Ripert (1992), Nancy Oakes (1993), Michael Cordúa (1994), Anne Quatrano (1995), Barbara Lynch (1996), Daniel Patterson (1997), Michael Symon (1998), John Besh (1999), Andrew Carmellini (2000), Wylie Dufresne (2001), Grant Achatz (2002), Stuart Brioza (2003), Graham Elliot (2004), Daniel Humm (2005), David Chang (2006), Gabriel Rucker (2007), Ethan Stowell (2008), Linton Hopkins (2009), Roy Choi (2010), and Carlo Mirarchi (2011).

All of the Best New Chefs are listed below by year:

Ownership
Food & Wine magazine was purchased from American Express Publishing by Time Inc. on October 1, 2013. Some editorial offices moved to the Time Inc office of Southern Living in Birmingham, Alabama in late 2017, and others remain in New York City. Meredith Corporation acquired Time Inc. in 2018. Dotdash closed on the purchase of Meredith in December 2021 to create the new company Dotdash Meredith.

See also
 List of food and drink magazines

References

External links
Food & Wine Magazine website
Food & Wine Classic event page on QVC.com 

Food and drink magazines
Lifestyle magazines published in the United States
Magazines established in 1978
Magazines published in Alabama
Mass media in Birmingham, Alabama
Monthly magazines published in the United States
Wine magazines
IAC (company)